Warm Water Cove is an outdoor, formerly industrialized picnic area in San Francisco, California, located near Pier 80 and the Dogpatch neighborhood.

The park contains works of graffiti art, abandoned warehouses, and punk concerts. Free, all-ages shows are set up a few times every month by local Bay Area and touring musicians. Along with 924 Gilman Street, it is one of a few punk rock venues in the Bay Area where D.I.Y. music is performed.

The park underwent some cleanup and renovation in 2007.

References

External links
Warm Water Cove at FoundSF website

Geography of San Francisco
Punk rock venues
Parks in San Francisco